Ahmed Mohamoud Farah (was a Somali politician and the Vice President of the Somali Democratic Republic, minister and a senior member of the Supreme Revolutionary Council. He hails from Adam Issa subdivision of the Issa Musse sub-clan of the Isaaq.

References

Refworld | Somalia: Information on the political career of Faduma Ahmed "Alim", including whether she was a member of parliament from 1979-1990 and served as deputy minister of education, and if so, whether she was elected or appointed or ever removed from the position, and if so, for what reasons, whether she was married to Ahmed Mohamoud Farah, who held several ministerial posts in the Barre government between 1970 and 1990, and if so, on his whereabouts today
Translations on Sub-Saharan Africa
Background Notes

1920 births
Possibly living people
Vice presidents of Somalia
Somali Revolutionary Socialist Party politicians